Quentin Vinlay Pryor (born September 26, 1983) is an American former basketball player. Standing at 6 ft 4 in (1.93 m), Pryor mainly played at the shooting guard and point guard position.

Career
Pryor signed with GasTerra Flames from Groningen, Netherlands in August 2013. Pryor was second in Sixth Man of the Year voting and won both trophies in the Netherlands. In May Flames took the Dutch Cup and on June 1 the national championship.

For the 2014–15 season Pryor signed with AEK Larnaca B.C.

References

1983 births
Living people
AEK Larnaca B.C. players
American expatriate basketball people in Austria
American expatriate basketball people in Cyprus
American expatriate basketball people in Germany
American expatriate basketball people in the Netherlands
Basketball players from Mississippi
Donar (basketball club) players
Dutch Basketball League players
FC Schalke 04 Basketball players
Junior college men's basketball players in the United States
Kapfenberg Bulls players
Morehead State Eagles men's basketball players
People from Eupora, Mississippi
Phoenix Hagen players
Point guards
Shooting guards
American men's basketball players